is a Japanese actor and entertainer who is represented by Watanabe Entertainment.

Biography
Masaki Nakao was born in Saitama Prefecture on November 27, 1996.

On 2016, Nakao made his drama debut in 2016 Super Sentai series Doubutsu Sentai Zyuohger as the protagonist, Yamato Kazakiri (Zyuoh Eagle).

Filmography

TV series

Advertisements

Film

Video games

Stage plays

References

External links
 

21st-century Japanese male actors
Japanese entertainers
1996 births
Living people
People from Saitama Prefecture
Actors from Saitama Prefecture